Cafeteria is a genus of marine bicosoecid described in 1988 by Tom Fenchel and D. J. Patterson. It was created after the discovery of a new species, Cafeteria roenbergensis, a tiny (5–10 μm) eukaryotic organism that is eaten by protozoa and small invertebrates. The name is meant to indicate the importance of the genus in the food web.

At least three species are recognised:
 ?Cafeteria marsupialis Larsen & Patterson, 1990
 Cafeteria ligulifera Larsen & Patterson 1990
 Cafeteria minimus (Griessmann 1913) Larsen & Patterson 1990
 Cafeteria mylnikovii Cavalier-Smith & Chao 2006
 Cafeteria roenbergensis Fenchel & Patterson, 1988
 Cafeteria sippewissettensis (Teal et al. 1998) Cavalier-Smith 2013

References

Encyclopedia of Life

Heterokont genera
Bikosea